Stemirna COVID-19 vaccine is a COVID-19 vaccine candidate developed by Stemirna Therapeutics.

References 

Clinical trials
Chinese COVID-19 vaccines
RNA vaccines